Ole Haabeth (born 18 September 1950) is a Norwegian politician for the Labour Party.

Haabeth was mayor of Fredrikstad until 2007. Following the 2007 elections, Haabeth became county mayor (fylkesordfører) of Østfold, succeeding party fellow Arne Øren.

References

1950 births
Living people
Labour Party (Norway) politicians
Mayors of places in Østfold
Chairmen of County Councils of Norway
People from Fredrikstad